Artemotil (INN; also known as β-arteether),  is a fast acting blood schizonticide specifically indicated for the treatment of chloroquine-resistant Plasmodium falciparum malaria and cerebral malaria cases. It is a semi-synthetic derivative of artemisinin, a natural product of the Chinese plant Artemisia annua.  It is currently only used as a second line drug in severe cases of malaria.

References

Antimalarial agents
Ethers
Organic peroxides
Sesquiterpenes
Trioxanes